Ellerhein is an Estonian girl's choir.

Ellerhein's predecessor was Tallinn Children's Choir, which was founded in 1951 by Heino Kaljuste. In 1969, the choir was named to Ellerhein.

1989–2012, the choir's principal conductor was Tiia-Ester Loitme. Since 2012, the principal conductor is Ingrid Kõrvits.

Nowadays, the choir encompasses three choirs: young children's choir (age 7–10), children's choir (age 11–13) and girls' choir (age 14–17).

Since 2003, the choir is a member of European Federation of Young Choirs Europa Cantat.

Awards:
 2003 Annual Prize of the Estonian Cultural Endowment
 2004 Grammy Award

References

External links
 

Estonian choirs